Bulfinch Ridge is a ridge  long that extends east from the north part of Endeavour Massif, Kirkwood Range, Victoria Land. It was named after Commander C. Bulfinch, U.S. Navy, captain of USS Atka in the Ross Sea in Operation Deep Freeze II and III, 1956–57 and 1957–58 seasons.

References 

Ridges of Victoria Land
Scott Coast